100 Years Later is a 2016 British documentary film directed, written, and produced by John Lubbock.  The film follows the work of historian Ara Sarafian, executive director of the Gomidas Institute in London, in his efforts to create dialogue in Turkey among Armenians, Kurds, and Turks on the occasion of the 100th anniversary of the Armenian genocide on 24 April 2015.  The film includes appearances by Selahattin Demirtaş and İsmail Beşikçi.

References

External links
 100 Years Later, full film on Vimeo
 

2016 films
2016 documentary films
2016 independent films
British documentary films
British independent films
Films shot in Turkey
Documentary films about the Armenian genocide
2010s English-language films
2010s British films